Labour of Love is the third Extended Play by Australian alternative rock group Frente!. It was released outside of Australia in 1993. The EP peaked at number 10 on the US Top Heatseekers chart.

Reviews
JT Griffith of All Music gave the EP 4.5 out of 5 saying; "[Labour of Love is] a collection of full songs and acoustic demos, the highlight is the standout cover of New Order's "Bizarre Love Triangle". Five of the seven tracks are two minutes or less. "Labour of Love" and "Not Given Lightly" are representative of the Frente! sound: acoustic love songs built around Angie Hart's Lisa Loeb-like vocals. "Paper, Bullets, Walls" finds Frente! in a more upbeat groove. Overall, the band had a classic pre-grunge, alternative sound."

Track listing
 "Labour of Love" - 3:03
 "Testimony" - 1:27
 "Not Given Lightly" - 3:33
 "Paper, Bullets, Walls" - 2:02
 "Risk" - 0:27
 "Bizarre Love Triangle" - 2:01
 "Oh Brilliance" - 1:57

Personnel
 Bass – Tim O'Connor
 Design – Marney McKenna, MushroomArt
 Illustration [Cover Illustration] – Ross Hipwell
 Vocals, Art Direction – Angie Hart
 Vocals, Guitar, Programmed By – Simon Austin

References

Frente! albums
Indie pop EPs
EPs by Australian artists
Mushroom Records albums
1993 EPs